The Mono Vampire Basketball Club is a Thai professional basketball team that previously played in the ASEAN Basketball League. They have also participated in the Thailand Basketball League. It is owned by Mono Group, a Thai media and technology conglomerate.

Established in 2014, the Vampires finished third at the Thailand Basketball League and the Thailand Basketball Super League in their first season.

In 2015, the Vampires won the Thailand Basketball League title. On the same year, the Vampires joined the ASEAN Basketball League but failed to perform.

The Vampires withdrew from the ABL mid-season after the 2019–20 season was suspended due to the COVID-19 pandemic.

Achievements

Season by season

Roster

Depth chart

Notable players
To appear in this section a player must have either:
- Set a club record or won an individual award as a professional player.
- Played at least one official international match for his senior national team at any time.

National Team
 Chitchai Ananti
 Darunpong Apiromvilaichai
 Teerawat Chantachon
 Chanachon Klahan
 Patiphan Klahan
 Ratdech Kruatiwa
 Kannut Samerjai
 Peeranat Semmesuk
 Sorot Sunthonsiri
 Jittaphon Towaroj
 Tyler Lamb
 Moses Morgan

Club Team
 Jason Brickman
 Coreontae DeBerry
 Samuel Deguara
 Reggie Johnson 
 Mike Singletary

Head coach
  Soontornpong Mawintorn (2015-2016)
  Douglas Marty (2017–2019)
  Andrej Urlep (2019–2021)

References

External links
 Mono Sports Entertainment

ASEAN Basketball League teams
Basketball teams established in 2014
Basketball teams in Thailand
2014 establishments in Thailand
Basketball teams in Bangkok